is a 2016 Japanese animated romantic fantasy film produced by CoMix Wave Films. It depicts a high school boy in Tokyo and a high school girl in the Japanese countryside who suddenly and inexplicably begin to swap bodies. The film was commissioned in 2014, written and directed by Makoto Shinkai. It features the voices of Ryunosuke Kamiki and Mone Kamishiraishi, with animation direction by Masashi Ando, character design by Masayoshi Tanaka, and its orchestral score and soundtrack composed by Radwimps. A light novel of the same name, also written by Shinkai, was published a month prior to the film's premiere.

Your Name premiered at the 2016 Anime Expo in Los Angeles on July 3, 2016, and was theatrically released in Japan on August 26, 2016 by Toho, and in the United States on April 7, 2017. The film was critically acclaimed, with praise for the animation, music, visuals, and emotional weight. The film grossed over ¥41.44 billion (US$382 million) worldwide, breaking numerous box office records, including becoming the third highest-grossing anime film of all time, unadjusted for inflation. The film won Best Animated Feature at the 2016 Los Angeles Film Critics Association Awards, 49th Sitges Film Festival, and as the 71st Mainichi Film Awards, and nominated for Best Animation of the Year at the 40th Japan Academy Prize. A live-action American remake by Paramount Pictures is in development.

Plot
In 2013, Mitsuha Miyamizu is a high school girl living in the rural town of Itomori, Japan. Bored of the town, she wishes to be a Tokyo boy in her next life. One day, she inexplicably begins to switch bodies intermittently with Taki Tachibana, a high school boy in Tokyo. Thus, when they wake up as each other on some mornings, they must live through the other's respective activities and social interactions for the day. They learn they can communicate with each other by leaving messages on paper, phones, and sometimes on each other's skin. Mitsuha (in Taki's body) sets Taki up on a date with coworker Miki Okudera, while Taki (in Mitsuha's body) causes Mitsuha to become popular at school. One day, Taki (in Mitsuha's body) accompanies Mitsuha's grandmother Hitoha and younger sister Yotsuha to leave the ritual alcohol kuchikamizake, made by the sisters, as an offering at the Shinto shrine located on a mountaintop outside the town. It is believed to represent the body of the village guardian god ruling over human connections and time. Taki reads a note from Mitsuha about the comet Tiamat, expected to pass nearest to Earth on the day of the autumn festival. The next day, Taki wakes up in his body and goes on a date with Miki, who tells him she enjoyed the date but also that she can tell he is preoccupied with thoughts of someone else. Taki attempts to call Mitsuha on the phone, but cannot reach her as the body-switching ends.

Taki, Miki, and their friend Tsukasa travel to Gifu by train on a trip to Hida in search of Mitsuha. However, Taki does not know the name of Itomori, relying on his sketches of the surrounding landscape from memory. A restaurant owner in Takayama is from Itomori and recognizes the town in the sketch. He takes Taki and his friends to the ruins of Itomori, which has been destroyed and where 500 residents were killed when Tiamat unexpectedly fragmented as it passed by Earth three years earlier. Taki observes Mitsuha's messages disappear from his phone, and his memories of her begin to gradually fade, realizing the two were also separated by time, as he is in 2016. Taki finds Mitsuha's name in the record of fatalities. While Miki and Tsukasa return to Tokyo, Taki journeys to the shrine, hoping to reconnect with Mitsuha and warn her about Tiamat. There, Taki drinks Mitsuha's kuchikamizake and then lapses into a vision, where he glimpses Mitsuha's past. He also recalls that he encountered Mitsuha on a train when she came to Tokyo the day before the event to find him, though Taki did not recognize her as the body-switching was yet to occur in his timeframe. Before leaving the train in embarrassment, Mitsuha had handed him her hair ribbon, which he has since worn on his wrist as a good-luck charm.

Taki wakes up in Mitsuha's body at her house on the morning of the festival. Hitoha deduces what has happened and tells him the body-switching ability has been passed down in her family as caretakers of the shrine. Taki convinces Tessie and Sayaka, two of Mitsuha's friends, to get the townspeople to evacuate Itomori, by disabling the electrical substation and broadcasting a false emergency alert. Taki heads to the shrine, realizing that Mitsuha must be in his body there, while Mitsuha wakes up in Taki's body. At sunset, the two sense each other's presence on the mountaintop but are separated due to contrasting timeframes and cannot see each other. When twilight falls, they return to their own bodies and see each other in person. After Taki returns Mitsuha's ribbon, they attempt to write their names on each other's palms so that they will remember each other. However, before Mitsuha can write hers, twilight passes, and they revert to their respective timeframes. When the evacuation plan fails, Mitsuha has to convince her father, Toshiki, the mayor of Itomori, to evacuate everyone. Before doing so, Mitsuha notices her memories of Taki are fading away and discovers he wrote "I love you" on her hand instead of his own name. After Tiamat crashes, Taki returns to his own timeframe and remembers nothing.

Five years later, Taki, having graduated from university, is searching for a job. He senses he has lost something vital that he cannot identify, and feels inexplicable interest in the events surrounding Tiamat, now eight years in the past: Itomori was destroyed, but all of its people survived as they had evacuated just in time. Mitsuha has since moved to Tokyo. Taki calls out to Mitsuha, saying that he feels he knows her, and she responds likewise. Having finally found what each had long searched for, they shed tears of happiness and simultaneously ask each other for their name.

Characters

 A high school boy in Tokyo. He is a 17-year-old student in his third year at Tokyo Metropolitan High School. He is a talented sketch artist and has aspirations to be an architect. He is short-tempered but well-meaning and kind. He spends time with Miki Okudera, working in a part-time job as a waiter at the Italian restaurant "Il Giardino delle Parole". A running gag in the film is that whenever Taki wakes up and realizes he has swapped bodies with Mitsuha that day, he immediately begins to fondle "his" breasts in amazement, only stopping once Mitsuha's sister, Yotsuha, sees her. Mitsuha teasingly calls him out for the habit when they meet in person for the first time during twilight. Taki later appeared in Shinkai's next film Weathering with You.

He lives with his father, who works at Kasumigaseki; Shinkai states, "I think his mother divorced his father a few years ago."

 A high school girl dissatisfied with her life in Itomori, a mountainous and rural town of Gifu Prefecture. She is a 17-year-old student in her second year at Itomori High School, but in reality is three years older than Taki. Mitsuha is usually seen with her hair tied up with a dark red braided ribbon that she made by hand herself. She and her sister are maidens of the family shrine. After her mother died, her father abandoned the shrine to pursue politics. She lives with her maternal grandmother, Hitoha, and her younger sister, Yotsuha, who is in elementary school. Mitsuha wishes to have a better life in Tokyo than having unavoidable encounters in the small town with her estranged father, the mayor, as well as her role as a shrine maiden (miko) in rituals for her mother's family shrine including making kuchikamizake, an ancient traditional way of making sake by chewing rice and spitting it back out to be fermented - all of which attracts mockery and disdain from her classmates. When switching bodies with Taki, Mitsuha forbids him from looking at or touching her body. Mitsuha later appeared in Shinkai's next film Weathering with You.

 Her birthday contradicts with the film's setting that she is 17 years old in the summer of her second year in high school, because as Shinkai says, "In their mind, they both kind of assumed that they were both born on December 1."

 One of Mitsuha's classmates; as of 2013, he is 17 years old and has a crush on Mitsuha. His nickname is "Tessie" ("Tesshi" in the dub). He is the son of the president of a local construction company, Teshigawara Construction. He is a lover of the monthly occult magazine MU (ja) and a mechanical geek. He has a 50-50 love/hate relationship with his hometown, Itomori, and from his own perspective, he initiates concrete measures to improve the town's situation, which earns him the sympathy of Taki (physically, Mitsuha).

 In the epilogue, he talks about his upcoming marriage to Sayaka.

 Teshigawara is named after Shoko Aizawa's middle school friend, Teshigawara, who appears in the seventh episode of Shinkai's novel .

 One of Mitsuha's classmates and her best friend; as of 2013, she is 17 years old. She has a calm but nervous personality and has a crush on Tessie. She is part of the school's radio broadcasting club, so she is tasked by Taki and Tessie with broadcasting the false emergency evacuation alert. Her sister, who works at the town hall, makes a brief appearance in the film.

 Sayaka is named after a friend of Shoko Aizawa's from middle school, who appears in the seventh episode of Shinkai's novel The Garden of Words.

 A classmate and friend of Taki. He has a cool personality and, like Taki, is interested in architecture. He works part-time at the same restaurant as Taki and Takagi. He worries about Taki whenever Mitsuha inhabits his body.

In his last scene, he is wearing a ring on his left-hand finger; and when asked about it, Shinkai said, "It's just a backstory, but I believe Tsukasa is engaged to Okudera."

 A classmate and friend of Taki. He is optimistic and has a large, crisp figure with an athletic appearance. Like Taki, he is an aspiring architect. He works part-time at the same restaurant as Taki and Tsukasa.

 A university student, one of Taki's friends, and his co-worker at the Italian restaurant "Il Giardino delle Parole". She is a beautiful and fashionable college girl who is popular with male waiters. She develops closer feelings for Taki when Mitsuha inhabits his body. She is a smoker, which Tsukasa discovers when they spend a night together while accompanying Taki on his search for Mitsuha. She is more commonly referred to as Ms. Okudera (Okudera-senpai) by her colleagues.

 When she meets Taki in 2021 after a long time, she is wearing an engagement ring and tells him that she is getting married soon. According to Shinkai: "It's just a backstory, but I believe that Tsukasa is engaged to Okudera." In the original novel, she is described as working at the Chiba branch of an apparel manufacturer as of 2021.

She was 82 years old as of 2013. Her favorite family tradition is kumihimo (thread weaving). She educates her grandchildren about the history and traditions of the shrine. Her daughter died peacefully after an illness and her son-in-law worked as a politician.

 It is revealed in the manga adaptation that Hitoha is alive as of 2021.

 Mitsuha's younger sister with a strong personality. She was 9 years old in the fourth grade as of 2013. She helps her grandmother and sister preserve the family tradition at the shrine. She believes Mitsuha is somewhat crazy but loves her anyway. She participates in creating both kumihimo and kuchikamizake. Yotsuha attended high school at the end of the film.

 The widowed father of Mitsuha and Yotsuha, and Futaba's husband. He was 54 years old as of 2013. He used to be a folklorist who came to town for research and is very strict and jaded from the event. After Futaba died, Toshiki abandoned the shrine and became the mayor.

 The mother of Mitsuha and Yotsuha, the wife of Toshiki, and the daughter of Hitoha. She appeared in a scene where Taki sees her in a vision of Mitsuha's life. Futaba died peacefully from an illness.

 A literature teacher at Itomori High School. She teaches the class about the word, "Kataware-doki" (meaning twilight). She also appeared in Shinkai's previous film The Garden of Words.

In September 2013, she was living in Tokyo, but as for why she is in Itomori in this film, the pamphlet states that it is "up to the viewer's imagination."

Production
The idea for this story came to Shinkai after he visited Yuriage, Natori, Miyagi Prefecture in July 2011, after the Great East Japan Earthquake occurred. He said, "This could have been my town." He said that he wanted to make a movie in which the positions of the people in Yuriage would be swapped with the viewers. The sketches that Shinkai drew during this visit have been shown in exhibitions.

In Makoto Shinkai's proposal sent to Toho on September 14, 2014, the film was originally titled , derived from a passage in a waka poem attributed to Ono no Komachi. On December 31, 2014, Shinkai announced that he had been spending his days writing storyboard for this film.

Inspiration for the story came from works including Shūzō Oshimi's Inside Mari, Rumiko Takahashi's Ranma ½, the Heian period novel Torikaebaya Monogatari, and Greg Egan's short story The Safe-Deposit Box. Shinkai also cited Interstellar (2014) by Christopher Nolan as an influence.

While the town of Itomori, one of the film's settings, is fictional, the film drew inspirations from real-life locations that provided a backdrop for the town. Such locations include the city of Hida in Gifu Prefecture and its library, Hida City Library.

Music

Yojiro Noda, the lead vocalist of the Japanese rock band Radwimps, composed the theme music of Your Name. Director Makoto Shinkai requested him to compose its music "in a way that the music will (supplement) the dialogue or monologue of the characters". Your Name features the following songs performed by Radwimps:
 
 
 
 

The soundtrack of the film was well received by both audiences and critics alike and is acknowledged as being one of the factors behind its success at the box office. The film's soundtrack was the runner-up in the "Best Soundtrack" category at the 2016 Newtype Anime Awards, and the song "Zenzenzense" was the runner-up in the "Best Theme Song Category".

Release

The film premiered at the 2016 Anime Expo convention in Los Angeles, California on July 3, 2016, and later was released theatrically in Japan on August 26, 2016. The film was released in 92 countries. In order to qualify for the Academy Awards, the film was released for one week (December 2–8, 2016) in Los Angeles.

In Southeast Asian countries, this movie was screened as well. Purple Plan streamed an English and Chinese subtitled trailer for the film and premiered the film in Singapore on November 3 and in Malaysia on November 8, with daily screenings onwards. M Pictures released it on November 10 in Thailand, and earned 22,996,714 baht (about US$649,056) in four days. Indonesian film distributor Encore Films announced that it would premiere the film in Indonesia on December 7. Cinema chain CGV Blitz also revealed that it would screen the film. Pioneer Films screened the film in the Philippines on December 14 and it immediately became the country's highest-grossing animated movie for the year. In Hong Kong, the film opened on November 11, and earned HK$6,149,917 (about US$792,806) in three days. The film premiered in Taiwan on October 21 and earned NT$64 million (about US$2 million) in its first week while staying in the first position in the box office earnings ranking. As of October 31, it has earned NT$52,909,581 (about US$1.666 million) in Taipei alone. It was released in Chinese theatres by Huaxia Film Distribution on December 2, 2016.

The film was released in Australian cinemas on limited release on November 24, 2016, by Madman Entertainment in both its original Japanese and an English dub. Madman also released the film in New Zealand on December 1, 2016.

The film was screened in France on December 28. The film was also released in the United Kingdom on November 18, 2016, distributed by Anime Limited.

The film was released in North American theaters on April 7, 2017, distributed by Funimation.

In Germany the film was screened in over 150 cinemas in January 2018, with the first day being completely sold out. It reached the Top 10 movies that weekend. Due to the high demand, additional screening days were arranged.

Home media
Your Name was released in 4K UHD Blu-ray, Blu-ray, and DVD on July 26, 2017, in Japan by Toho Pictures. The release was offered in Regular, Special, and Collector's editions. Funimation announced on July 1 at Anime Expo 2017 that the film would be released on Blu-ray and DVD by the end of 2017 but did not specify a date. At Otakon 2017, they announced they are releasing the movie in both Standard and Limited Edition Blu-Ray and DVD Combo Packs on November 7, 2017.

In its first week, the Blu-ray standard edition sold 202,370 units, the collector's edition sold 125,982 units and the special edition sold 94,079 units. The DVD Standard Edition placed first, selling 215,963. Your Name is the first anime to place three Blu-ray Disc releases in the top 10 of Oricon's overall Blu-ray Disc chart for 2 straight weeks. In 2017, the film generated  in media revenue from physical home video, soundtrack and book sales in Japan.

In the United Kingdom, it was 2017's second best-selling foreign language film on home video (below Operation Chromite) and again 2018's second best-selling foreign language film (below My Neighbor Totoro).

Television broadcast
The Japanese television broadcast of Your Name was premiered on November 4, 2017, through satellite television broadcaster Wowow. In addition, a special program dedicated to Makoto Shinkai as well as his previous works were also broadcast on the same channel. It also received a Japanese terrestrial television premiere on January 3, 2018, via TV Asahi and the initial broadcast received a 17.4% audience rating.

Your Name has made its first premiere on Philippine television through free-to-air broadcaster ABS-CBN as well as its HD television service on February 18, 2018, but in edited form due to being cut for commercials with a short runtime of 75 minutes. According to Kantar Media statistics, the first free-to-air broadcast of the film received an audience rating of 9.2% while the AGB Nielsen NUTAM statistics, it received a 3.1% audience rating. On April 9, 2020, as part of its Holy Week presentation, the film was aired again with minor cuts for content and longer runtime of 102 minutes (excluding commercials in its 2-hour timeslot) and it immediately became a trending topic through social media platforms whereas Makoto Shinkai himself thanked the viewers of the ABS-CBN broadcast of the film.

Reception

Box office

Your Name became a huge commercial success, especially in Japan, where it grossed . The film achieved the second-largest gross for a domestic film in Japan, behind Spirited Away, and the fourth-largest ever, behind Titanic and Frozen. It is the first anime not directed by Hayao Miyazaki to earn more than $100 million (~￥10 billion) at the Japanese box office. It topped the box office in Japan for a record-breaking 12 non-consecutive weekends. It held the number-one position for nine consecutive weekends before being toppled by Death Note: Light Up the New World in the last weekend of October. It returned to the top for another three weeks before finally being dethroned by Hollywood blockbuster Fantastic Beasts and Where to Find Them.

The success of the film also extended beyond Japan. In China, it became the highest-grossing Japanese film in the world's second-largest movie market on December 17, 2016. It has grossed  in China and is the highest-grossing 2D animated film in the country. Its opening screened in over 7,000 theaters. It made an estimated $10.9 million on its opening day from 66,000 screenings and attracting over 2.77 million admissions, the biggest 2D animated opening in the country. It also held the record for the highest-grossing non-Hollywood foreign film in China, up until it was surpassed by two Indian films, Dangal and Secret Superstar, in May 2017 and February 2018, respectively.

In Thailand it grossed ฿44.1 million. As of December 26, the film has grossed US$771,945 in Australia. and US$95,278 in New Zealand. On a December 20 blog post, the Australian distributor Madman stated that the film had made over AU$1,000,000 in the Australian box office alone before closing its limited release run.

In the United States and Canada, the film grossed $5,017,246. In the United Kingdom, it grossed  in 2016, making it the year's fifth highest-grossing non-English and non-Hindi film in the UK.

Critical response
The review aggregator website Rotten Tomatoes reports that 98% of critics have given the film a positive review based on 116 reviews, with an average rating of 8.2/10. The site's critics consensus reads, "As beautifully animated as it is emotionally satisfying, Your Name adds another outstanding chapter to writer-director Makoto Shinkai's filmography." On Metacritic, the film has a score of 79 out of 100 based on 26 critics, indicating "generally favorable reviews".

Mark Schilling of The Japan Times gave the film a rating of 4 out of 5 and praised the film's animation for its "blend of gorgeous, realistic detail and emotionally grounded fantasy". However, he criticized the film's "over-deliver[y]" of "the comedy of adolescent embarrassment and awkwardness" and its ending for being "To the surprise of no one who has ever seen a Japanese seishun eiga (youth drama)".

Reception outside of Japan was also very positive. Mark Kermode called the film his ninth favourite film to be released in the United Kingdom in 2016. US reviews were mostly positive. The New York Times described it as "a wistfully lovely Japanese tale", while David Sims of The Atlantic said it was "a dazzling new work of anime". Conversely, The Boston Globe had a mixed opinion of the film, saying that it was "pretty but too complicated". Mike Toole from Anime News Network listed it as the third-best anime film of all time. John Musker and Ron Clements, directors of the Disney animated films The Great Mouse Detective, The Little Mermaid, Aladdin, Hercules, Treasure Planet, The Princess and the Frog, and Moana, praised the film for its beauty and uniqueness.

Despite the praise he received, Shinkai insisted that the film is not as good as it could have been: "There are things we could not do, Masashi Ando [Director of Animation] wanted to keep working [on] but had to stop us for lack of money ... For me, it's incomplete, unbalanced. The plot is fine but the film is not at all perfect. Two years was not enough."

Accolades

Adaptations

Books

Your Name is a Japanese light novel written by Makoto Shinkai. It is a novelization of the animated film of the same name, which was directed by Shinkai. It was published in Japan by Kadokawa on June 18, 2016, a month prior to the film premiere. By September 2016, the light novel had sold around 1,029,000 copies. An official visual guide was also released. The novel sold over 1.3million copies, while the novel and visual guide sold over 2.5million copies combined.

Live-action film
On September 27, 2017, producer J. J. Abrams and screenwriter Eric Heisserer announced that they were working on a live-action remake of Your Name to be released by Paramount Pictures and Bad Robot Productions, alongside the original film's producers, Toho, who will handle the film's distribution in Japan. The film was being written by Eric Heisserer, who revealed that the Japanese right holders want it to be made from the western point of view. In February 2019, Marc Webb signed on to direct the remake. The film will be about a young Native American woman living in a rural area and a young man from Chicago who discover they are magically and intermittently swapping bodies. In September 2020, Deadline Hollywood reported that Lee Isaac Chung had taken over as both writer and director, working off a draft penned by Emily V. Gordon, with Abrams and Genki Kawamura co-producing. In July 2021, Chung departed from the project, citing scheduling issues. On October 31, 2022, Carlos López Estrada was announced to write and direct the remake, replacing Webb and Chung.

See also
 List of highest-grossing animated films
 List of highest-grossing anime films
 List of highest-grossing films in Japan

Notes

References

External links

  
 
 
 
 
 
 

2016 films
2016 animated films
2016 anime films
2010s high school films
2010s teen fantasy films
2010s teen romance films
Japanese animated feature films
Animated films about time travel
Animated teen films
Anime with original screenplays
Body swapping in films
Comets in film
CoMix Wave Films films
Crunchyroll Anime Awards winners
Films about dreams
Films about natural disasters
Films based on Japanese novels
Films directed by Makoto Shinkai
Films set in Gifu Prefecture
Films set in Tokyo
Films with screenplays by Makoto Shinkai
Funimation
Films about impact events
Japanese animated fantasy films
Japanese high school films
2010s Japanese-language films
Japanese romantic fantasy films
Kadokawa Dwango franchises
Mythology in popular culture
Toho animated films
Films set in 2013
Films set in 2016
Films set in 2021